Bruno Filipe Lopes Correia (born 30 September 1988 in Vila Nova de Gaia, Porto District), known as Bruninho, is a Portuguese professional footballer who plays as a winger.

References

External links

Portuguese League profile 

1988 births
Living people
Sportspeople from Vila Nova de Gaia
Portuguese footballers
Association football wingers
Primeira Liga players
Liga Portugal 2 players
Segunda Divisão players
CD Candal players
Padroense F.C. players
Vitória F.C. players
F.C. Penafiel players
GD Bragança players
C.D. Mafra players
Académico de Viseu F.C. players
Leça F.C. players